Tetsuji (written: 哲二, 哲治, 鉄二, 鉄史, 轍次 or 徹治) is a masculine Japanese given name. Notable people with the name include:

, Japanese footballer and manager
, Japanese golfer
, Japanese mixed martial artist
, Japanese lexicographer and sinologist
Tetsuji Murakami (1927–1987), Japanese karateka
, Japanese politician
, Japanese mathematician
, Japanese theatre and film director
, Japanese actor

Japanese masculine given names